Flor Yanira Gurrola Valenzuela is a Mexican-American politician and educator serving as a member of the New Mexico House of Representatives for the 16th district. She assumed office on January 9, 2023.

Early life and education 
Gurrola was born in Chihuahua, Mexico, and moved to Albuquerque, New Mexico, in 2000. She earned a Bachelor of Science in electronic industrial engineering from the Chihuahua Institute of Technology and a Master of Science in curriculum and instructional leadership from the College of Santa Fe.

Career 
Outside of politics, Gurrola is a bilingual math teacher. She works as a professional development coordinator and was previously a member of the board of Dual Language Education New Mexico. In January 2023, the Bernalillo County Board of Commissioners appointed Gurrola to the New Mexico House of Representatives.

References 

Living people
New Mexico Democrats
Members of the New Mexico House of Representatives
Women state legislators in New Mexico
American politicians of Mexican descent
People from Chihuahua (state)
Politicians from Chihuahua (state)
People from Albuquerque, New Mexico
Politicians from Albuquerque, New Mexico
Educators from New Mexico
Chihuahua Institute of Technology alumni
Santa Fe University of Art and Design alumni
People from Bernalillo County, New Mexico
Year of birth missing (living people)